
Year 871 (DCCCLXXI) was a common year starting on Monday (link will display the full calendar) of the Julian calendar.

Events 
 By place 

 Europe 
 The English retreat onto the Berkshire Downs. The Great Heathen Army, led by the Danish Viking kings Halfdan and Bagsecg, march out after the Saxons. Six pitched battles are fought between the Danes and Wessex. Of two of them the place and date are not recorded, the others are:
 January 4 – Battle of Reading: A West Saxon force, under the command of King Æthelred I and his brother Alfred, is defeated by the Danes at Reading. Among the many dead on both sides is Æthelwulf. The Saxon troops are forced to retreat, allowing the Vikings to continue their advance into Wessex.
 January 8 – Battle of Ashdown: The West Saxons, led by Æthelred I and Alfred, gather at the Berkshire Downs. The Danes under the command of Halfdan and Bagsecg occupy the high ground, but are successfully attacked by Alfred's men. During the battle Alfred breaches the shield wall formation.
 January 22 – Battle of Basing: The West Saxon army, under the command of Æthelred I, is defeated at Basing. The Danes, led by Halfdan, are victorious; Æthelred is forced to flee and regroup, leaving behind precious winter supplies.
 February 2 – Franco-Lombard forces, aided by a Croatian fleet (of Sclaveni), led by Emperor Louis II, capture Bari, capital of the Emirate of Bari in Southern Italy.
 March 22 – Battle of Meretum: The West Saxons, led by Æthelred I and Alfred, are defeated by the Danes. Among the many dead is Heahmund, bishop of Salisbury.
 April 23 – Alfred succeeds as king of Wessex after Æthelred's death. He makes peace with the Danes, and pays them Danegeld, each ruling parts of England.
 May – Battle of Wilton: Alfred the Great is defeated by the Danes at Wilton (along the southern side of the River Wylye), leaving him in retreat for several years.
 Alfred makes Winchester his residence. The Danish armies colonize areas of north, central and eastern England, which become known as the Danelaw.
 The Danes sail down the River Thames, to raid the Mercian port of Lundenwic (in the London area). Here, over the winter, they divide their spoils.
 King Rhodri Mawr ("the Great") of Gwynedd annexes Seisyllwg, uniting most of Wales under his rule (approximate date).
 Tønsberg, the oldest surviving town in the Nordic countries, is founded.

 Arabian Empire 
 September – Battle of Basra: Zanj rebels in Mesopotamia sack and capture Basra (see Zanj Rebellion).

 By topic 

 Literature 
 The Cairo Genizah, a collection of Jewish manuscript fragments, is written (approximate date).

Births 
 Abu Bakr Muhammad ibn Ali al-Madhara'i, Tulunid vizier (d. 957)
 Fujiwara no Tokihira, Japanese statesman (d. 909)
 García I, king of León (approximate date)
 Li Qi, chancellor of Later Liang (d. 930)
 Wang Jianli, Chinese general (d. 940)

Deaths 
 January 4 – Æthelwulf, Saxon ealdorman
 January 8 – Bagsecg, Viking king
 April 23 – Æthelred I, king of Wessex
 June 10 – Odo I, Frankish nobleman
 Ailill mac Dúnlainge, king of Leinster 
 Cathalán mac Indrechtaig, king of Ulaid 
 Dae Geonhwang, king of Balhae
 Engelschalk I, Frankish margrave
 Fadl Ashsha'ira, Abbasid female poet
 Heahmund, bishop of Salisbury
 Hunfrid, bishop of Thérouanne
 Ibn 'Abd al-Hakam, Muslim historian (b. 803)
 Solomon I, bishop of Constance
 Uathmharan mac Brocan, king of Aidhne (Ireland)
 William II, Frankish margrave
 Yahya ibn Mu'adh al-Razi, Muslim Sufi (b. 830)

References